Lewis Hurlbert Sr. House is a historic home located at Aurora, Dearborn County, Indiana. It was built in 1844, and is a two-story, five bay, frame dwelling with Italianate and Greek Revival style design elements.  It has a double pile plan, sits on a cut limestone foundation, and side gable roof.  It has a two-story addition built in the mid-19th century.  Also on the property are the contributing stable, outhouse, and two sections of cat iron fencing.

It was added to the National Register of Historic Places in 1994.  It is located in the Downtown Aurora Historic District.

References

Houses on the National Register of Historic Places in Indiana
Greek Revival houses in Indiana
Italianate architecture in Indiana
Houses completed in 1844
Houses in Dearborn County, Indiana
National Register of Historic Places in Dearborn County, Indiana
Historic district contributing properties in Indiana